Donald Wilson Ping (November 5, 1898 – July 4, 1972) was an American football and baseball coach. He served as the head football coach at the University of Evansville in Evansville, Indiana from 1946 to 1954, compiling a record of 38–35–5. Ping was also the head baseball coach at Evansville from 1947 to 1966, tallying a mark of 128–191–3.

Ping played college baseball at Millikin University in Decatur, Illinois. He died on July 4, 1972, at Deaconess Hospital in Evansville.

Head coaching record

College football

References

External links
 

1898 births
1972 deaths
Baseball catchers
Decatur Commodores players
Evansville Purple Aces athletic directors
Evansville Purple Aces baseball coaches
Evansville Purple Aces football coaches
Fort Smith Twins players
Millikin Big Blue baseball players
Springfield Senators players
Terre Haute Tots players
High school football coaches in Illinois
High school football coaches in Indiana
High school football coaches in Kentucky
People from Newton, Illinois